Sue Thomas may refer to:

 Sue Thomas (FBI specialist), deaf specialist for the United States Federal Bureau of Investigation
 Sue Thomas: F.B.Eye, a television show based on her life
 Susan Thomas, Baroness Thomas of Walliswood
 Sue Thomas (author)  (born 1951), English author
 Susan Thomas (judge), chief judge (since 2020) of the High Court of New Zealand